The EU Institute of International Law is a graduate school in Berlin primarily engaged in education on broader issues of European Union law and policy. It described itself as a think tank.

The EU Institute focuses on topical issues in international commercial law, and European law. The European Union is a major trading partner of the United States and Asia, and as the enlargement process of the EU continues a sound understanding of the many legal and policy questions that arise is imperative for any lawyer interested in international law.

Schools
The EU Institute holds annual short courses: a summer school  The schools bring together scholars, members of governments, judges, policy makers, and students from around the world. Eschewing conventional lecture-type formats, the emphasis is on achieving an in-depth understanding of select issues through discussions and seminars.

In addition to the academic program, the courses aim to develop cultural awareness, knowledge about Germany and the European Union, and offer a holiday retreat.

Universities and colleges in Berlin